Pandenes is one of six parishes (administrative divisions)  in Cabranes, a municipality within the province and autonomous community of Asturias, in northern Spain.

Villages
 Pandenes 
 Los Villares

References

Parishes in Cabranes